Labidochromis zebroides is a species of cichlid endemic to Lake Malawi where it is only known to occur in areas with rocky substrates around Likoma Island and Mazimbwe Island.  This species can reach a length of  TL.  It can also be found in the aquarium trade.

References

zebroides
Fish of Lake Malawi
Fish of Malawi
Fish described in 1982
Taxonomy articles created by Polbot